Empty Saddles is a 1936 American Western film directed by Lesley Selander.  It is a Buck Jones B Western. (Empty Saddles is also the title of a 1962 Burt Arthur mystery novel.)

Plot

Cast
 Buck Jones as Buck Devlin
 Louise Brooks as 'Boots' Boone
 Harvey Clark as 'Swaps' Boone
 Charles B. Middleton as Cimarron 'Cim' White
 Lloyd Ingraham as Lem Jessup, alias Jim Grant
 Frank Campeau as Kit Kress
 Earl Askam as Henchman Red Madden
 Ben Corbett as Vegas, head drover
 Niles Welch as Jasper Kade
 Gertrude Astor as Eloise Hayes
 Claire Rochelle as Madge Grant
 Charles Le Moyne as Mace
 W. E. Lawrence as Cull Cole

References

External links 
 

1936 films
1930s English-language films
American black-and-white films
1936 Western (genre) films
Universal Pictures films
Films directed by Lesley Selander
American Western (genre) films
1930s American films